Tobias Stimmer (7 April 1539 – 4 January 1584) was a Swiss painter and illustrator. His most famous work is the paintings on the Strasbourg astronomical clock.

Biography 
He was born in Schaffhausen, and was active in Schaffhausen, Strasbourg and Baden-Baden as a wall and portrait painter. He made a great number of drawings for woodcuts (Bible scenes, allegories, etc.) which were published by the printer Sigmund Feyerabend in Frankfurt am Main, and Bernhart Jobin in Strasbourg.

Stimmer followed Hans Holbein the Younger, but developed his own mannerism. Among his wall paintings remain the "House zum Ritter" in Schaffhausen, although this was actually much restored and changed.

References
Hans Lieb: Tobias Stimmers Geburt und Tod, in Schaffhauser Beiträge zur Geschichte, vol 67, pages 255-262, 1990.

Footnotes

External links

Pictures of the House zum Ritter in the Schaffhausen city archives
Mannerism article, Columbia encyclopedia

1539 births
1584 deaths
16th-century Swiss painters
Swiss male painters
People from Schaffhausen